Newport is an unincorporated community in Barton County, in the U.S. state of Missouri.

History
Newport was platted in 1874. A variant name was Horse Creek. A post office called Horse Creek was established in 1858, the name was changed to Newport in 1878, and the post office closed in 1915.

References

Unincorporated communities in Barton County, Missouri
Unincorporated communities in Missouri